All on Account of the Milk is a 1910 American silent comedy film directed by Frank Powell and starring Mary Pickford and Blanche Sweet. The short was shot in Fort Lee, New Jersey, the Biograph Company using one of the many early film studios in America's first motion picture industry that were based there at the beginning of the 20th century. A print of the film survives in the film archive of the Library of Congress. The film was distributed as a one reel production.

Cast
 Mary Pickford as The Young Woman
 Kate Bruce as The Young Woman's Mother
 Blanche Sweet as The Maid
 Mack Sennett as The Farmhand
 Arthur V. Johnson as The Young Contractor
 Flora Finch
 Jack Pickford as At Construction Site

See also
 List of American films of 1910
 Mary Pickford filmography
 Blanche Sweet filmography

References

External links

1910 films
1910 drama films
1910 short films
American silent short films
American black-and-white films
Biograph Company films
Films directed by Frank Powell
Films shot in Fort Lee, New Jersey
American drama short films
Milk in culture
1910s American films
Silent American drama films
1910s English-language films